Anthony W. Potts is a United States Army major general who serves as the Program Executive Officer for Command, Control and Communications (Tactical) since June 22, 2022. He most recently served as the Program Executive Officer for Soldier of the United States Army, and before that served as the Deputy Commanding General of the United States Army Research, Development, and Engineering Command and Senior Commander of the Natick Soldier Systems Center.

References

Living people
Place of birth missing (living people)
Recipients of the Legion of Merit
United States Army generals
United States Army personnel of the Gulf War
Year of birth missing (living people)